Holoregmia is a monotypic genus of flowering plants belonging to the family Martyniaceae. The only species is Holoregmia viscida.

Its native range is Northeastern Brazil.

References

Martyniaceae
Monotypic Lamiales genera